Korgalzhyn (Qorğaljyn) is a village in the Akmola Region, Kazakhstan. It serves as the administrative center of Korgalzhyn District. The Nura River slowly flows around the selo. It is situated 120 km south-west of Astana. Population: 

The selo serves as the main and only base for entering the Saryarka — Steppe and Lakes of Northern Kazakhstan Unesco World Heritage site with Lake Tengiz at its heart. Many foreigners, mostly birdwatchers from all over the world come to the selo.

References

Populated places in Akmola Region